Chaitanya Bharathi Institute of Technology (CBIT) is a private engineering college located in Gandipet, near Financial District, Hyderabad, Telangana, India. The college is affiliated to Osmania University and is accredited by the National Board of Accreditation. The institute received an autonomous status in 2013.

History 
CBIT was established in 1979. The institute is affiliated to Osmania University, originally with three undergraduate programs and an intake of 200 students. By 2014 this had grown to nine undergraduate and seven postgraduate courses with a total intake of 9000 students . It was inaugurated by late Dr. Marri Chenna Reddy.

CBIT is the first private engineering college in Telangana.

One of the milestones for the college was when its students were part of the team involved in the design and successful launch of a satellite, STUDSAT, with the Indian Space Research Organisation. STUDSAT was successfully placed in orbit and received the first signal on 12 July 2010 at 11:07 AM IST.

Campus 

CBIT is located at Gandipet near Financial District in Hyderabad. The campus is 25 km from Secunderabad Railway Station and 28 km from Rajiv Gandhi International Airport. It is well connected with radial roads and outer ring road (ORR) for an easy access by road.

With a total of 12 blocks in the campus, eight blocks are assigned to ECE, EEE, CSE, IT, Mechanical, Mechanical (Production), Civil, Chemical, Bio-Tech, MBA, and MCA departments. Four blocks are for the library, R&D, physical education department (sports), cafeteria, and assembly halls. Workshop sheds and laboratories are found between the blocks.

Academics

Academic programmes
The college admits undergraduates and postgraduates. Undergraduate students are admitted through the statewide EAMCET examination conducted for intermediate students and TS ECET conducted for Diploma students.
Postgraduate students through GATE and ICET, which are conducted every year. Apart from EAMCET, GATE, and ICET exams, students are also admitted through B-Category (selection based on IITJEE, AIEEE, EAMCET ranks) and NRI quota.

CBIT offers undergraduate courses in BE and BTech. Bachelor of Engineering (BE) course is for multiple disciplines of ECE, EEE, CSE, IT, Mechanical, Mechanical (Production), Civil and Bachelor of Technology (BTech) for Chemical and Bio-Tech.  Postgraduate courses are offered in the streams of ME, MTech, MBA, MCA. The Master of Technology (MTech) course is offered to Computer Science Engineering students. Master of Engineering courses are offered in other disciplines. The college also offers Master of Business Administration (MBA) and Master of Computer Applications (MCA) courses through its department of management.

Apart from the regular undergraduate program the college also has an International Center (IC-CBIT) that offers dual degree programs with foreign universities in engineering. It provides the facility for attending various workshops on multi topics that avail students a great opportunity to progress in every opportunity they utilize.

Rankings 

CBIT was ranked 133 by the National Institutional Ranking Framework (NIRF) engineering ranking in 2021.

Student life

Events

TEDxCBIT

The students of CBIT organize the independent TED event as TEDxCBIT. The event is completely organized by the students of CBIT and has been organized twice since 2017, each with a different theme.

ASME CBIT

ASME CBIT is the student chapter of ASME at Chaitanya Bharathi Institute of Technology, Hyderabad. It is a multidisciplinary group that provides a platform for the students to promote their talent, enhance their knowledge, increase their skills, and showcase their creativity.

The foundation for this student chapter was laid in the year 2012 by the Mechanical Engineering department students with the help of Dr. P. Ravinder Reddy (Former HOD, Mechanical Engineering). Ever since its inception, the members have endeavored to create an environment where one can get exposed to the latest innovations in the engineering field and showcase their skills. ASME CBIT members have participated in various events such as HPVC, SDC as a part of E-Fest Asia Pacific in the years 2017, 2018, 2019 & 2020.

Sudhee 
Sudhee is the intra-department technical fest organized during the beginning of each odd semester, where each department hosts its events under a common theme which includes events based on robotics, ethical hacking, and various other topics over the course of 2 days.

Shruthi 
On the other hand, Shruthi is the inter-department 3-day cultural fest organized at the end of each even semester, which acts as a host for many cultural events. Shruthi also welcomes a new public celebrity from the entertainment industry as their chief guest for the 3rd day.

Sports 
Every year, as part of Shruthi, the inter-department fest, an inter-department sports competition is held for staff and students. Sports in the fest are basketball, football, cricket, badminton, volleyball, kabaddi, handball, throwball and track, and field events. There are indoor games too, along with outdoor games like carrom, chess, and table tennis.  There are tournaments held within CBIT and also with other colleges.

CARPEDIEM 

The college also holds an additional cultural fest Carpediem every two years, usually after the completion of Shruthi or at the end of each academic year.

Homecoming 
Homecoming, the annual alumni meet that is held on 25 December of every year organized by Chaitanya Smriti, the alumni association of CBIT, where the past students pay a visit to their alma mater and meet their friends.

NSS unit 
The main activities of the NSS unit are plantation, blood donation camp, services at orphanages and old age homes, road safety, anti-ragging squads, medical camps in villages, environmental awareness, and programs, service to physically and mentally challenged people, issue of voter ID cards to students and staff, first aid training to students and staff, and fire fighting mock drills. Conducting "Street Cause", NSS is meant for, serving the poor in villages by health check-up and providing free medicine. Competitions on road safety measures enable awareness in order to avoid accidents and loss of lives.

Notable alumni 

 Sekhar Kammula, film director in the Telugu film industry – 1991 – Mechanical Engineering.
 Y. S. Chowdary, elected member of the Member of Parliament (Rajya Sabha) in 2010.
 J. D. Chakravarthy, film actor in the Telugu film industry – 1986.
 Komatireddy Venkat Reddy, politician.
 Neeraj Ghaywan, film director in Bollywood – 2002 – Electrical Engineering.

References

External links 

 

All India Council for Technical Education
Engineering colleges in Telangana
Educational institutions established in 1979
Engineering colleges in Hyderabad, India